was a town located in Sakai District, Fukui Prefecture, Japan.

In the 1870s, the Meiji government constructed a harbor at Mikuni, under supervision of the Dutch engineer George Arnold Escher.

As of 2003, the town had an estimated population of 23,207 and a density of 499.94 persons per km². The total area was 46.42 km².

On March 20, 2006, Mikuni, along with the towns of Sakai (former), Harue and Maruoka (all from Sakai District), was merged to create the city of Sakai.

Every August there is a fireworks display at Sunset Beach in Mikuni. Many of the fireworks are floating charges distributed by boat. These explode on the water's surface, creating unique effects.

External links
 Sakai official website 

Dissolved municipalities of Fukui Prefecture
Sakai, Fukui